

1985

See also 
 1985 in Australia
 1985 in Australian television

References

External links 
 Australian film at the Internet Movie Database

1985
Australian
Films